Tribute to Václav Havel (Czech: Pocta Václavu Havlovi) was an event held in memory of Václav Havel, the last Czechoslovak and the first Czech President, writer, playwright and human rights activist. The concert took place in Lucerna Music Bar in Prague on 23 December 2011, five days after the death of Havel.

Main organisers of the event 
 David Gaydečka (Manager of the Goe's Garage)
  (Former Secretary to President Václav Havel)
 Jakub Mejdřický (PP Production)
 Lubomír Schmidtmayer (Director of the Palace Akropolis)
 Jindra Zemanová (Meet Factory)

Stages

Lucerna Great Hall 
Moderator: 
 5:30 pm - 
 6:30 pm - Tata Bojs
 6:50 pm - Dan Bárta and Robert Balzar
 7:00 pm - Garage & Tony Ducháček
 7:45 pm - David Koller and Ivan Král
 8:10 pm - Jasná Páka and Hudba Praha
 8:40 pm - Radim Hladík and Vladimír Mišík
 8:50 pm - Štěpán Rak
 8:55 pm - 
 9:15 pm - ,  and 
 9:30 pm - 
 9:45 pm - Suzanne Vega
 9:50 pm - Ivan Král and Jan Ponocný
 10:30 pm - The Plastic People of the Universe
 11:10 pm - The Velvet Underground Revival Band
 11:30 pm - End of concert

Lucerna Music Bar 
Moderator: 
 6:00 pm - Máma Bubo
 6:40 pm - Phil Shoenfelt & Southern Cross
 7:30 pm - Lanugo
 8:30 pm - Toxique
 9:35 pm - Zrní
 10:35 pm -

Lucerna Cinema 
Documentary films:
 President Václav Havel (Dir. V. Bojanovský, 1990)
 President and Director (1996)
 Havel to the Castle (Dir. P. Koutecký, 1998)
 American in Prague or Partnership for Jazz (Dir. P. Koutecký, 1994)
 "An American Tribute to Vaclav Havel and a Celebration of Democracy in Czechoslovakia" held in St. John the Divine, New York (Dir. Caroline Stoessinger, 1990)
Live performance
 Václav Havel: Garden Party - Theatre Divadlo na tahu, Dir. Andrej Krob

Lucerna Cinema Café 
Photographs of Václav Havel
Curator: Kateřina Blažková-Bajzíková
Photographers:
 Karel Cudlín
 
 Bohdan Holomíček
 
 
 Oldřich Škácha

References

External links 
 Official website of concert
 Documentary film on the event by Metropol TV with English subtitles
 Prague Post: Painting the Town / Lucerna to host evening of tribute to Václav Havel

2011 in music
2011 in the Czech Republic
Tribute concerts
Václav Havel
December 2011 events in Europe
2010s in Prague